Vasiliki (Vasilikí; formerly Voivoda (Βοϊβόδα, Voïvóda) is a village and a former municipality in the Trikala regional unit, Thessaly, Greece. Since the 2011 local government reform it is part of the municipality Meteora, of which it is a municipal unit. The municipal unit has an area of 41.765 km2. Population 2,200 (2011). German-Greek professional footballer, José Lloyd Cholevas has ancestral ties to the village as his father, Achilles Cholevas was born and raised here.

References

Populated places in Trikala (regional unit)